Al Hollingsworth may refer to:

 Al Hollingworth (1918–2005), Canadian, lawyer, politician, and judge
 Al Hollingsworth (baseball) (1908–1996), American Major League Baseball pitcher
 Alvin Hollingsworth (1928–2000), American painter and comics artist